John Fleming (30 October 1921 – 24 November 1981) was an English professional rugby league footballer who played in the 1940s and 1950s, and coached in the 1960s.

Background
Jackie Fleming was born in Wigan, Lancashire, England, and he died aged 60 in Wigan, England.

Playing career

International honours
Jackie Fleming won caps for England while at Warrington in 1948 against France (2 matches), and Wales, in 1949 against Wales, and France, and while at Widnes 1951 against France.

Championship final appearances
Jackie Fleming played , i.e. number 2, in Wigan's 13-9 victory over Dewsbury in the Championship Final first-leg during the 1943–44 season at Central Park, Wigan on Saturday 13 May 1944, and played  in the 12-5 victory over Dewsbury in the Championship Final second-leg during the 1943–44 season at Crown Flatt, Dewsbury on Saturday 20 May 1944,  and played  in Warrington's 15-5 victory over Bradford Northern in the Championship Final during the 1947–48 season at Maine Road, Manchester.

Challenge Cup Final appearances
Jackie Fleming played  in Widnes' 0-19 defeat by Warrington in the 1949–50 Challenge Cup Final during the 1949–50 season at Wembley Stadium, London on Saturday 6 May 1950.

Club career
Jackie Fleming made his début for Warrington on Saturday 1 February 1947, and he played his last match for Warrington on Monday 26 December 1949.

References

External links
Statistics at wolvesplayers.thisiswarrington.co.uk
Statistics at wigan.rlfans.com
Heritage Numbers - In Debut Order  at wigan.rlfans.com 

1919 births
1984 deaths
Batley Bulldogs players
England national rugby league team players
English rugby league coaches
English rugby league players
Rugby league centres
Rugby league five-eighths
Rugby league players from Wigan
Rugby league wingers
Warrington Wolves coaches
Warrington Wolves players
Widnes Vikings players
Wigan Warriors